Generally speaking, second-row elements such as silicon (Si) are known to stabilize α-carbanions with greater effectiveness than a first-row element, which also means Si could destablize the α-carbocations. This effect is known as silicon alpha effect. Another term that always associates with silicon alpha effect is the so-called silicon beta effect, which means Si at the β position could support formation of carbocations.

Moreover, there is also another kind of silicon-α-effect, which is mainly about the hydrolysis on the silicon atom. This effect could greatly enhance the hydrolysis rate on silicon and have a lot of practical applications in sealants, adhesives, coatings, and spray foams.

History 
In 1946, Sommer and co-workers reported that under conditions of basic hydrolysis, the alpha C-Cl bonds in trichloro(1-chloroethyl)silane (Cl3SiCHClCH3) and trichloro(1-chloropropyl)silane (Cl3SiCHClCH2CH3) failed to hydrolyze, while the beta C-Cl bonds in the analogous 2-chloroethyl and 2-chloropropyl compounds (Cl3SiCH2CH2Cl, Cl3SiCH2CHClCH3) reacted rapidly under the same conditions. They then concluded that silicon inhibits electrofugal activity at the alpha carbon.

However, this conclusion seems to be contrary to the common sense in chemistry since the electronegativity of Si is lower than carbon (C), indicating the electron donating properties of Si. As a result of such confusion, many scientists are devoted to finding the answer to such phenomenon. In 1994, Yong and coworkers conducted first experiment to enable comparisons of the effects of α- and β-Si(CH3)3 moieties on the free energies of C-H homolysis and C-H heterolysis using thermodynamic data. They gave a solid conclusion that the β-silicon atom could help stabilize the carbocations and α-silicon atom will destablize the carbocations. However, the mechanisms under this phenomena still need more discussion.

Properties of bonds to silicon 
In order to get a better understanding of the role of silicon in stabilizing the α-carbanions or destabilizing the α-carbocations, some general properties of silicon against carbon should be rationalized first.

Electronegativity 

It is known that the electronegativity of Si (1.90) is lower than C (2.55) and the Si-C bond will be polarized, making Si susceptible to nucleophilic attack.

Bond length 
The Si–C bond (1.89 Å) is significantly longer than a typical C–C bond (1.54 Å), suggesting that the SiMe3 group is sterically less demanding than a tert-butyl group.

Bond energy 
Single bonds from Si to electronegative elements O, Cl, and F are very strong. Since such strong bonds are

formed, substitution at Si is especially easy when the nucleophile is O-, Cl-, or F-.

Negative hyperconjugation 
After considering those properties above, researchers conclude the reasons for the first-kind Silicon-α-Effect. 3rd period heteroatoms can stabilize adjacent carbanions charges via hyperconjugation (this is sometimes called negative hyperconjugation). For the case in silicon, it could be depicted as the picture oon the right. The σ* orbitals of Si could help to stablize the electrons in carbon, enhancing the formation of carbanions.

Hydrolysis on silicon 
The silicon α‑effect described above is mainly focused on carbon. In fact, there is another kind so-called silicon α‑effect, which is focused on silicon. It describes another phenomenon that under hydrolysis condition, certain α-silane-terminated prepolymers crosslink 10-1000 times faster than the corresponding prepolymers produced from conventional Cγ-functionalized trialkoxypropylsilanes and dialkoxymethylpropylsilanes.

History 
This silicon α-effect was first observed in the late 1960s by researchers at Bayer AG as an increase in reactivity at the silicon atom for hydrolysis and was used for cross-linking of α-silane-terminated prepolymers. For a long time after that, people attributed this reactivity as silicon α-effect. However, the real mechanism beneath it had been debated for many years after this discovery. Generally, this effect has been rationalized as an intramolecular donor- acceptor interaction between the lone pair of the organofunctional group (such as NR2, OC(O)R, N(H)COOMe) and the silicon atom. However, this hypothesis has been proved incorrect by Mitzel and coworkers and more experiments are needed to interpret this effect.

Mechanism study 

Reinhold and coworkers performed a systematical experiment to study the kinetics and mechanisms of hydrolysis of such compounds. They prepared a series of α-silanes and γ-silanes and tested their reactivity in different pH (acidic and basic regime), functional group X and the spacer
between the silicon atom and the functional group X. 

In general, they find that under basic conditions, the rate of hydrolysis is mainly controlled by the electrophilicity of the silicon center and the rate of the hydrolysis of the γ-silanes is less influenced by the generally electronegative functional groups than α-silanes. More electronegative the functional groups are, the higher the rate of hydrolysis. However, under acidic conditions, the rate of hydrolysis depends on both the electrophilicity of the silicon center (determining the molecular reactivity) and the concentration of the (protonated) reactive species. Under acidic conditions, the nucleophile changes from OH- to H2O, so it involves the process of protonation and the atoms are protonated could be either silicon or the functional group X. As a result, the general trend in acidic solution is more complicated.

References 

Silicon